The Ages of Man are the historical stages of human existence according to Greek mythology and its subsequent Roman interpretation.

Both Hesiod and Ovid offered accounts of the successive ages of humanity, which tend to progress from an original, long-gone age in which humans enjoyed a nearly divine existence to the current age of the writer, in which humans are beset by innumerable pains and evils. In the two accounts that survive from Ancient Greece and Rome, this degradation of the human condition over time is indicated symbolically with metals of successively decreasing value (but increasing hardness).

Hesiod's Five Ages

The Greek poet Hesiod (between 750 and 650 BC), in his poem Works and Days (lines 109–201). His list is:
 Golden Age – The Golden Age is the only age that falls within the rule of Cronus. Created by the immortals who live on Olympus, these humans were said to live among the gods and freely mingled with them. Peace and harmony prevailed during this age. Humans did not have to work to feed themselves, for the earth provided food in abundance. They lived to very old age but with a youthful appearance and eventually died peacefully. Their spirits live on as "guardians". Plato in Cratylus (397e) recounts the golden race of men who came first. He clarifies that Hesiod did not mean men literally made of gold, but good and noble. He describes these men as daemons upon the earth. Since δαίμονες (daimones) is derived from δαήμονες (daēmones, meaning knowing or wise), they are beneficent, preventing ills, and guardians of mortals.
 Silver Age – The Silver Age and every age that follows fall within the rule of Cronus's successor and son, Zeus. Men in the Silver age lived for one hundred years under the dominion of their mothers. They lived only a short time as grown adults, and spent that time in strife with one another. During this Age men refused to worship the gods and Zeus destroyed them for their impiety. After death, humans of this age became "blessed spirits" of the underworld.
 Bronze Age – Men of the Bronze Age were hardened and tough, as war was their purpose and passion. Zeus created these humans out of ash tree. Their armor was forged of bronze, as were their homes, and tools. The men of this Age were undone by their own violent ways and left no named spirits; instead, they dwell in the "dark house of Hades". This Age came to an end with the flood of Deucalion.
 Heroic Age – The Heroic Age is the one age that does not correspond with any metal. It is also the only age that improves upon the age it follows. It was the heroes of this Age who fought at Thebes and Troy. This race of humans died and went to Elysium.
 Iron Age – Hesiod finds himself in the Iron Age. During this age, humans live an existence of toil and misery. Children dishonor their parents, brother fights with brother, and the social contract between guest and host (xenia) is forgotten. During this age, might makes right, and bad men use lies to be thought good. At the height of this age, humans no longer feel shame or indignation at wrongdoing; babies will be born with gray hair and the gods will have completely forsaken humanity: "there will be no help against evil."

Ovid's Four Ages
The Roman poet Ovid (1st century BC – 1st century AD) tells a similar myth of Four Ages in Book 1.89–150 of the Metamorphoses. His account is similar to Hesiod's, with the exception that he omits the Heroic Age. Ovid emphasizes that justice and peace defined the Golden Age. He adds that in this age, men did not yet know the art of navigation and therefore did not explore the larger world. Further, no man had knowledge of any arts but primitive agriculture. In the Silver Age, Jupiter introduces the seasons, and men consequently learn the art of agriculture and architecture. In the Bronze Age, Ovid writes, men were prone to warfare, but not impiety. Finally, in the Iron Age, men demarcate nations with boundaries; they learn the arts of navigation and mining; they are warlike, greedy, and impious. Truth, modesty, and loyalty are nowhere to be found.

Related usage
These mythological ages are sometimes associated with historical timelines. In the chronology of Saint Jerome, the Golden Age lasts c. 1710 to 1674 BC, the Silver Age 1674 to 1628 BC, the Bronze Age 1628 to 1472 BC, the Heroic Age 1460 to 1103 BC, while Hesiod's Iron Age was considered as still ongoing by Saint Jerome in the fourth century AD.

Modern historical periodisation such as the Three-age system has taken up the Bronze Age and the Iron Age, seeking to define them precisely on the basis of systematic archaeological research, while discarding the Golden and Silver Ages as myth and substituting the Stone Age as the earliest Age.

See also

Similar concepts include:

 Christian: Six Ages of the World, Dispensationalism
 Hindu: Yuga Cycle (Satya, Treta, Dvapara and Kali Yuga)
 Buddhist: Three Ages
 Jain: Utsarpiṇī and Avasarpiṇī
 Aztec: Five Suns
Giambattista Vico's ricorso: the return of the society to a relatively more primitive condition
JRR Tolkien's fictional "Four Ages"
Oswald Spengler's Civilizational model
 Modern archaeology: Three-age system (Stone, Bronze and Iron), with each of the stages further divided into substages (e.g. Stone Age comprises Paleolithic, Mesolithic and Neolithic).

References

External links

The Ages of Man at Greek Mythology Link
"Five Ages of Man in Greek Mythology According to Hesiod" by N.S. Gill
Hendrick Goltzius engravings of the Ages of Man from the De Verda collection"
Ages of Man at GreekMythology.com

Greek mythology
Roman mythology
Historiography